The 2019 Atlanta Blaze season will be the fourth season for the Atlanta Blaze of Major League Lacrosse. Liam Banks enters his second season as head coach, after leading the Blaze to their best record in franchise history (7–7) in 2018. It will be the team's first year at Grady Stadium in downtown Atlanta, after spending its first three years at Fifth Third Bank Stadium in Kennesaw.

On July 28, due to maintenance at Grady Stadium, the Blaze announced they would be playing their last three home games at Atlanta Silverbacks Park

On September 7, the Blaze clinched their first playoff berth with a 15–14 win over the Dallas Rattlers. It also gave them a franchise-best eighth win of the season.

Transactions

Offseason
September 21, 2018 - The Blaze announce the signing of a core group of players: Tommy Palasek, Liam Byrnes, Justin Pennington, and Chris Madalon.
January 21, 2019 - Attackman Randy Staats is reacquired in a deal with the Dallas Rattlers. In exchange, the Blaze will send their third and fourth round picks in the 2019 Collegiate Draft to the Rattlers.

Collegiate Draft
The 2019 Collegiate Draft was held on March 9 in Charlotte, North Carolina at the NASCAR Hall of Fame. Inside Lacrosse gave the Blaze a "C" in their team-by-team draft grades.

The Blaze began their rookie signings with a bang on May 15 with the announcement that #1 overall draft pick (who they acquired when the Ohio Machine folded in April) Alex Woodall, face-off specialist from Towson had chosen the Blaze over Whipsnakes Lacrosse Club and the Premier Lacrosse League.

The next day, the Blaze announced four of their top six draft picks, Brendan Sunday, Dylan Gaines, Colton Jackson, and Eddie Bouhall had agreed to contracts. This group joined other rookies TJ Comizio, Brett Craig, and Jack Mangan.

Schedule

Regular season

Standings

References

External links
 Team Website

Major League Lacrosse seasons
Atlanta Blaze